Ratnagiri was a Lok Sabha parliamentary constituency in Maharashtra. In 2008, it was merged with some other areas to form a new Lok Sabha seat called Ratnagiri-Sindhudurg Lok Sabha constituency.

Members of Parliament

Election results

See also
 Ratnagiri-Sindhudurg Lok Sabha constituency
 List of Constituencies of the Lok Sabha

References

1962 establishments in Maharashtra
Former Lok Sabha constituencies of Maharashtra
Former constituencies of the Lok Sabha
2008 disestablishments in India
Constituencies disestablished in 2008